Lapland Calendar is a 1957 Norwegian documentary film directed by Per Høst. It was entered into the 1957 Cannes Film Festival.

Cast
 Karen Anna Logje - Rauna
 Klemet Veimel - Nilas
 Matti Mikkel Sara - Matti
 Jon Luoso - Heika

References

External links

1957 films
1950s Norwegian-language films
Norwegian documentary films
1957 documentary films